Giver Taker is the debut studio album by American musician Anjimile. It was released on September 18, 2020, by Father/Daughter Records.

Release
Anjimile announced the release of their debut studio album on July 8, 2020.

Singles
On July 8, 2020, the first single "Maker" was released, alongside the announcement of the album. In a press release, Anjimile explained how the song relates to "coming to terms with my transgender identity, ruminating on the lack of acceptance from my parents, and kind of relating my transness to the father/son/holy ghost trinity." The song was featured on Pastes 7 Best Songs of the Week for July 10, 2020.

On August 12, 2020, the second single "Baby No More" was released. Of the single, Anjimile explained that they had written the song a month before they got sober, saying "I was in a romantic relationship but I was not taking care of myself in any sense of the phrase, and thusly the relationship was suffering as a result. At the time I quite literally felt like I was losing my mind vis a vis alcoholism. Active alcoholism and committed romantic relationships generally do not mix well, and ‘Baby No More’ is more or less what happens when you're not a good boyfriend. Although it's got a very groovy and relatively light-hearted musical vibe, some of the lyrics are quite dark."

The third single "In Your Eyes" was released on September 2, 2020, and focuses on Anjimile's struggles of grappling with homophobia. The music video for the single was produced by Gabe Goodman and Justine Bowe.

Critical reception
Giver Taker was met with "generally favorable" reviews from critics. At Metacritic, which assigns a weighted average rating out of 100 to reviews from mainstream publications, this release received an average score of 80 based on 9 reviews. Aggregator Album of the Year gave the release a 79 out of 100 based on a critical consensus of 10 reviews. At AnyDecentMusic?, which assigns a normalized rating out of 10 to reviews from mainstream publications, the album received a weighted average score of 7.7 based on 7 reviews.

Writing for Beats Per Minute, Gareth O'Malley said: "Chronicling grief and loss, and written while recuperating from drug and alcohol abuse, the debut album from Boston’s Anjimile Chitambo is an intense affair dressed up in sumptuous ornamentation." He went on to say the "set of songs, intimate and filled with lyrical and musical nuances that encourage repeated listening, is supremely rewarding." Kitty Empire of The Observer gave the album four stars out of five, explaining "Tracks like Maker or Ndimakukonda boast compelling African instrumentation and cadences, putting significant stylistic space between Anjimile and [Sufjan] Stevens. Throughout, the production – also by relative unknowns – is pin-sharp and generous." Candace McDuffie of Paste gave the release an 8.6 out of 10, saying the release "is captivating in its detailed storytelling, luscious harmonies and admirable vulnerability. Anjimile’s devotion to his craft is both inspiring and harrowing, which we hear in the highs and lows of this consummate project. His trials and tribulations have only fueled his creative vision."

Accolades

Track listing

Personnel

Musicians
 Anjimile Chithambo – primary artist, guitar
 Justine Bowe – clarinet, piano, wurlitzer, backing vocals
 Gabe Goodman – bass
 Ben Chapoteau-Katz – saxophone
 Andy Fordyce – drums
 Susan Mandel – cello
 Sam Moss – banjo, violin
 Zac Coe – congas, drums
 Kristina Teuschler – clarinet
 Samuel Lee – saxophone
 Kyra Sims – French horn
 Rachel Sumner – flute
 Eric Seligmann – trumpet
 Fiona Wood – violin
 Maria Kowalski – violin
 Sarah Grella – backing vocals

Production
 Justine Bowe – producer, arranger
 Gabe Goodman – engineer, producer
 Will Radin – engineer, mixing
 Eric Seligmann – arranger
 Joe Lambert – mastering
Other personnel
 Rebecca Larios – cover painting
 Amy Madden – layout

References

2020 debut albums
Father/Daughter Records albums